Monophorus is a genus of minute sea snails with left-handed shell-coiling, marine gastropod mollusks or micromollusks in the family Triphoridae.

Species
Species within the genus Monophorus are as follows:

 Monophorus alboranensis Rolán & Peñas, 2001
 Monophorus amicitiae Romani, 2015
 Monophorus angasi (Crosse & P. Fischer, 1865)
 Monophorus ateralbus Rolán & Fernández-Garcés, 1994
 Monophorus atratus (Kosuge, 1962)
 Monophorus australicus B. A. Marshall, 1983
 Monophorus caracca (Dall, 1927)
 Monophorus cinereus (Hedley, 1902)
 Monophorus constrictus (Laseron, 1958)
 † Monophorus cristulatus Sacco, 1895 
 Monophorus diminutus (Laseron, 1958)
 Monophorus episcopalis (Hervier, 1898)
 Monophorus erythrosoma (Bouchet & Guillemot, 1978)
 Monophorus fascelinus (Suter, 1908)
 Monophorus graphius (Kosuge, 1963)
 Monophorus hopensis (Laseron, 1958)
 † Monophorus insertus (Marwick, 1928) 
 † Monophorus invectus Harzhauser, 2014 
 Monophorus iwaotakii (Kosuge, 1963)
 Monophorus lucidulus (Hervier, 1898)
 Monophorus micans (Laseron, 1958)
 Monophorus monachus (Hervier, 1898)
 Monophorus monocelha M. Fernandes & Araya, 2019
 Monophorus nigrofuscus (A. Adams, 1854)
 Monophorus nitidus (Kosuge, 1963)
 Monophorus olivaceus (Dall, 1889)
 Monophorus pantherinus Rolán & Peñas, 2001
 Monophorus perversus (Linnaeus, 1758)
 Monophorus puniceus (Kosuge, 1963)
 Monophorus quadrimaculatus (Hervier, 1898)
 † Monophorus renauleauensis Landau, Ceulemans & Van Dingenen, 2018 
 Monophorus rufulus (R. B. Watson, 1886)
 Monophorus stiparus (Laseron, 1958)
 Monophorus strictus (Laseron, 1958)
 Monophorus subaurus (Laseron, 1958)
 Monophorus tessellatus (Kosuge, 1963)
 Monophorus testaceus (Kosuge, 1963)
 Monophorus thiriotae Bouchet, 1985
 Monophorus tubularis (Laseron, 1958)
 Monophorus verdensis Fernandes & Rolán, 1988
 Monophorus verecundus M. Fernandes & Pimenta, 2020

Synonyms
 Monophorus fascelina (Suter, 1908): synonym of Monophorus fascelinus (Suter, 1908) (incorrect gender)

Distribution
Species in this genus are found in the Mediterranean Sea and in the Atlantic Ocean around the Azores, the Canary Islands and Cape Verde.

References

 Marshall B.A. (1983) A revision of the Recent Triphoridae of southern Australia. Records of the Australian Museum supplement 2: 1-119.
 Vaught, K.C. (1989). A classification of the living Mollusca. American Malacologists: Melbourne, FL (USA). . XII, 195 pp
 Gofas, S.; Le Renard, J.; Bouchet, P. (2001). Mollusca, in: Costello, M.J. et al. (Ed.) (2001). European register of marine species: a check-list of the marine species in Europe and a bibliography of guides to their identification. Collection Patrimoines Naturels, 50: pp. 180–213
 Rolán E., 2005. Malacological Fauna From The Cape Verde Archipelago. Part 1, Polyplacophora and Gastropoda.

External links
 Granata-Grillo, G. (1877). Sul Cirropteron semilunare Sars, e del nuovo sottgenere Monophorus. Bullettino della Societa Malacologia Italiana. 3: 54-60
 Bouchet, P. (1985). Les Triphoridae de Méditerranée et du proche Atlantique (Mollusca, Gastropoda). Lavori, Società Italiana di Malacologia. 21: 5-58
 Finlay H.J. (1926). A further commentary on New Zealand molluscan systematics. Transactions of the New Zealand Institute. 57: 320-485, pls 18-23
 Bucquoy E., Dautzenberg P. & Dollfus G. (1882-1886). Les mollusques marins du Roussillon. Tome Ier. Gastropodes. Paris: Baillière & fils. 570 pp., 66 pls
 Marshall B.A. (1983) A revision of the Recent Triphoridae of southern Australia. Records of the Australian Museum supplement 2: 1-119

Triphoridae